The 2010 Maine Black Bears football team was an American football team that represented the University of Maine as a member of the Colonial Athletic Association (CAA) during the 2010 NCAA Division I FCS football season. In their 18th season under head coach Jack Cosgrove, the Black Bears compiled a 4–7 record (3–4 against conference opponents) and tied for eight place in the CAA.

Schedule

References

Maine
Maine Black Bears football seasons
Maine Black Bears football